Morkovice-Slížany is a town in Kroměříž District in the Zlín Region of the Czech Republic. It has about 2,900 inhabitants.

Administrative parts
The town is made up of town parts of Morkovice and Slížany.

Geography
It lies in the Litenčice Hills. The Morkovický stream flows through the town and supplies three ponds in the territory.

History

Morkovice was first mentioned in 1222, Slížany was first mentioned in 1353. Morkovice-Slížany was created by merger of municipalities of Morkovice and Slížany in 1960.

Sights
The Morkovice Castle was built on the side of an old fortress in the 17th century. The castle complex also includes a park and a pair of baroque statues of Saints Florian and Wendelin.

The Church of Saint John the Baptist has a medieval core, but its current appearance is a result of the reconstruction in the first half of the 18th century.

Twin towns – sister cities

Morkovice-Slížany is twinned with:
 Žitavany, Slovakia

Gallery

References

External links

Cities and towns in the Czech Republic
Populated places in Kroměříž District